Rebecca O'Neill (born 9 November 1981) is a former association football player who represented New Zealand at international level.

O'Neill made a single appearance for Football Ferns in a 0–6 loss to Japan on 21 May 2005.

References

1981 births
Living people
New Zealand women's international footballers
New Zealand women's association footballers
Women's association football defenders